The 2011 Copa de España de Fútbol Sala is the 22nd staging of the Copa de España de Fútbol Sala. It was held in the Pabellón Pedro Delgado, in Segovia, Spain, between 3 February and 6 February 2011.

Qualified teams

Final tournament

Knockout stage

Quarter-finals

Semi-finals

Final

See also
2010–11 División de Honor de Futsal
2010–11 Copa del Rey de Futsal

References

External links
LNFS website

Copa de España de Futsal seasons
Espana
Futsal